James Herron Eckels (November 22, 1858 – April 14, 1907) was a United States Comptroller of the Currency from 1893 to 1897.

Eckels' appointment broke the precedent that only those with previous banking experience could serve as Comptroller. Eckels, a 35-year-old lawyer, was named Comptroller by President Grover Cleveland.

A month after Eckels took office, the country plunged into the Panic of 1893. His efforts to restore confidence in the national banking system played an important role in bringing back the economic health of the nation. Eckels became president of a national bank in Chicago in 1898.

References

United States Comptrollers of the Currency
Comptrollers in the United States
1858 births
1907 deaths
Cleveland administration personnel
McKinley administration personnel